Admiral Du Xigui (November 12, 1875 – December 28, 1933) was a Chinese naval officer during the late Qing Dynasty and the Warlord Era.

Biography
Born in Fuzhou, he graduated from the Nanjing naval college in 1902. In July 1911, Du was appointed as the commander of a vessel. His crew followed orders from Yuan Shikai to sail up the Yangtze and help put down the Wuchang Uprising later that year. However, when he saw that the Qing empire was collapsing, Du and his sailors mutinied, joining the Republican government. The uprising was what forced the Qing naval minister Sa Zhenbing to resign his post. After Yuan became the head of the government in Beijing, Du continued to serve him.

In 1922, he was made chief of the navy and helped the Zhili clique defeat Zhang Zuolin. In the spring of 1923, Shanghai's fleet rebelled and Du took responsibility by resigning but was recalled in November.  In 1924, he commanded the Yangtze fleet of Jiangsu and defeated the Anhui clique's Zhejiang fleet led by Lin Jianzhang.  Several ships defected to his side giving him control of Shanghai's waters.

In 1926, he served concurrently as acting president, premier, and minister of the navy. The Nanjing-based Nationalist government later employed him and sent him on an inspection tour of foreign navies.

Gallery

See also

 List of premiers of the Republic of China
 List of presidents of the Republic of China

References 

1875 births
1933 deaths
Politicians from Fuzhou
Presidents of the Republic of China
Republic of China Navy admirals
Qing dynasty admirals
Premiers of the Republic of China
Republic of China politicians from Fujian
Generals from Fujian